Karl Scheurer (27 September 1872, in Sumiswald – 14 November 1929) was a Swiss politician.

He was elected to the Swiss Federal Council on 11 December 1919 and died in office on 14 November 1929. He was affiliated with the Free Democratic Party of Switzerland. 

During his time in office he held the Military Department (department of defence) and was President of the Confederation in 1923.

External links 
 

1872 births
1929 deaths
People from Emmental District
Swiss Calvinist and Reformed Christians
Free Democratic Party of Switzerland politicians
Members of the Federal Council (Switzerland)
Members of the National Council (Switzerland)
Swiss military officers
University of Bern alumni
20th-century Swiss politicians